Baba Sow (born 26 July 1995) is a Senegalese football midfielder who plays for Montalegre. He played on the Portuguese second tier for Varzim.

References

1995 births
Living people
Senegalese footballers
Juventude de Pedras Salgadas players
SC Mirandela players
C.D.C. Montalegre players
Varzim S.C. players
Association football midfielders
Liga Portugal 2 players
Senegalese expatriate footballers
Expatriate footballers in Portugal
Senegalese expatriate sportspeople in Portugal